The Sainte-Marie River (French: Rivière Sainte-Marie) is a tributary of the Gulf of St. Lawrence, flowing in the municipality of L'Île-d'Anticosti, in the Minganie Regional County Municipality, in the administrative region of Côte-Nord, in province of Quebec, in Canada.

The Sainte-Marie River is the most westerly river in the SÉPAQ Anticosti territory. The "Rivière-Sainte-Marie" sports camp was built during the 20th century, west of the mouth of this stream.

The main forest road (east-west) of Anticosti Island serves the upper part of this valley. A network of secondary roads connect to this main road, as well as to the west to a forest road network for forestry purposes.

Forestry is the main economic activity in this area; recreational tourism activities, second.

Geography 
The Sainte-Marie river draws its source from Lake Sainte-Marie (length:  almost round in shape;) located in the central-western part of the Anticosti Island. This lake has a marsh area on the north side and the south side. The mouth of Lac Sainte-Marie is located at:
  northeast of the town center of the village of Port-Menier;
  south-east of the north shore (Martin Bay) of Anticosti Island;
  north of the south shore of Anticosti Island.

From its source, the Sainte-Marie River flows south between the Bec-Scie River (located on the west side) and Rivière aux Cailloux (located on the east side).

  towards the south first, passing under the bridge of the main road (east–west direction) of the island, successively collecting a stream (coming from the north-east), the discharge (coming from the west) of Lac de la Tour and the discharge (coming from the east) of Lake Nelson, then crossing Lake Elsie, up to its mouth;
  towards the south entering the territory of the SÉPAQ Anticosti, collecting four streams (coming from the west), two streams (coming from the east) and the discharge (coming from the northeast) of Paul Pond, forming a hook of  towards the west at the end of the segment, up to its mouth.

Toponymy 
The toponyms "Cap Sainte-Marie", "rivière Sainte-Marie" and "Camp sportif Rivière-Sainte-Marie" are linked.

The toponymic designation “Sainte-Marie River” is one of the oldest on Anticosti Island. It appears on the Map of Canada (or of New France), designed by Guillaume Delisle in 1703. The toponym “Rivière Ste Marie” appears in 1904 on a map drawn up by Joseph Schmitt, designating the watercourse west of the toponym "Falaises Ste Marie".

The Commission de toponymie du Québec believes that this toponym was originally attributed by the explorer Louis Jolliet, who had become the owner of the island since 1680; he would have designated it in honor of his eldest daughter Marie-Charlotte. After becoming the owner of the island, Louis Jolliet spent his summers in the western part of Anticosti Island, where he had built a house.

The toponym "rivière Sainte-Marie" was made official on December 5, 1968.

See also 

List of rivers of Quebec

References 

Rivers of Côte-Nord
Anticosti Island
Minganie Regional County Municipality